The coracobrachialis muscle is a muscle in the upper medial part of the arm. It is located within the anterior compartment of the arm. It originates from the coracoid process of the scapula; it inserts onto the middle of the medial aspect of the body of the humerus. It is innervated by the musculocutaneous nerve. It acts to adduct and flex the arm.

Structure

Origin 
Coracobrachialis muscle arises from the (deep surface of the) apex of the coracoid process of the scapula (a common origin with the short head of the biceps brachii). It additionally also arises from the proximal portion of tendon of origin of the biceps brachii muscle.

Insertion 
It is inserted (by means of a flat tendon) into an impression at the middle of the medial border of the body of the humerus (shaft of the humerus) between the attachments of the medial head of the triceps brachii and the brachialis.

Innervation
Coracobrachialis muscle is perforated by and innervated by the musculocutaneous nerve, which arises from the anterior division of the upper trunk (C5, C6) and middle trunk (C7) of the brachial plexus.

Function
The action of the coracobrachialis is to flex and adduct the arm at the glenohumeral joint (shoulder joint). Also, the coracobrachialis resists deviation of the arm from the frontal plane during abduction. Therefore, the contraction of the coracobrachialis leads to two distinct movements at the shoulder joint. It both draws the humerus forward, causing flexion of the arm, and draws the humerus toward the torso, causing adduction of the arm. To a smaller extent, it also turns the humerus inwards, causing internal rotation.  Another important function of the coracobrachialis is the stabilization of the humeral head within the shoulder joint, especially when the arm is hanging freely at a person's side.

Clinical significance
The overuse of the coracobrachialis can lead to stiffening of the muscle. Common causes of injury include chest workouts or activities that require one to press the arm very tight towards the body, e.g. work on the rings in gymnastics.  

Symptoms of overuse or injury are pain in the arm and shoulder, radiating down to the back of the hand. In more severe cases, the musculocutaneous nerve can get trapped, causing disturbances in sensation to the skin on the radial part of the forearm and weakened flexion of the elbow, as the nerve also supplies the biceps brachii and brachialis muscles. 

Actual rupture to the coracobrachialis muscle is extremely rare. Very few case reports exist in the literature, and it is reported to be caused by direct trauma to the contracted muscle. Avulsion of the muscle's origin from the coracoid as a result of indirect forces is even more unusual.

References
.

Additional images

External links

 PTCentral

Muscles of the upper limb